Gulf Island Fabrication is an American manufacturer of specialized structures and marine vessels used in the energy sector. The company builds offshore oil and gas platforms, ships and also foundations for offshore wind turbines. It also provides maintenance and marine repair services in-shop and out in the field. The company has built some of the largest offshore platforms in the world.

The company's headquarters are located in Houston, Texas and its seven building yards are in Louisiana and Texas. Gulf Island Fabrication and Bechtel are partners. The company was founded by Alden “Doc” Laborde, a World War II Navy commander who later worked the offshore oil and gas industry. In 1985, the company took over a bankrupt rival named Delta Fabrication. The company became publicly listed in 1997. The company offered 2,000,000 shares at $15 per share. With a total offer amount of $30 million. The company had diversified revenue to build ships and expanded by taking over LeeVac Shipyards in the beginning of 2016. The acquisition provided about $112 million incremental contract backlog during the industry downturn.

References

A Mighty Wind Tries to Lift Rig Builders Past Oil’s Downturn
A Debt-Free And Cash-Rich, Dividend-Paying Company With Significant Upside Potential
Gulf Island warns of possible layoffs
Gulf Island Fabrication bracing for layoffs at Texas subsidiary, newspaper reports
Should You Worry About The Future Of Gulf Island Fabrication, Inc. (NASDAQ: GIFI)?
Gulf Island Fabrication, Inc. Reports Second Quarter Earnings
Gulf Island, Carbo warn of possible layoffs affecting nearly 300 workers
My Thesis on Gulf Island Fabrication
Gulf Island Fabrication Is A (Blunt) Falling Knife
Gulf Island Fabrication wins foundation work for first U.S. offshore wind farm
Gulf Island Fabrication CEO sees boom potential in Gulf of Mexico shallow water

External links
Official site of Gulf Island Fabrication
Louisiana builder is hard at work on R.I.'s offshore wind turbines + Video

Construction and civil engineering companies of the United States
Energy engineering and contractor companies